Orges Shehi (born 25 September 1977) is an Albanian professional former football player and current coach of Tirana.

In July 2010, he joined Skënderbeu and won 6 consecutive league titles (2010–11, 2011–12, 2012–13, 2013–14, 2014–15, 2015–16).

Club career

Teuta
Shehi began his career with local side Teuta as a teenager at age of 12, and made his professional debut for the club in the Kategoria Superiore during the 1994–95 campaign. He had to wait another two seasons to become the regular second choice keeper, behind Kujtim Shtama. He made his Union of European Football Associations (UEFA) debut in the first qualifying round of the UEFA Cup on 24 July 1996 in the second leg against MFK Košice, coming on as an 88th-minute substitute for Shtama. Teuta ended up losing the game 2–1 and the tie 6–2 on aggregate. Overall, he ended up making 9 league appearances as his side finished in mid-table, as well as reaching the quarter-final of the Albanian Cup, narrowly being eliminated by KS Lushnja. He became the club's first choice keeper the following season, and made 32 appearances in the league, missing just two games throughout the season as his side finished 5th.

He joined Bylis on loan ahead of the 1997–98 season, and was an integral part of the club's highest finish, as they reached third place, just two points behind the eventual winners KF Tirana. He helped the club reach Europe for the first time in their history, and they were tied against Slovakian side FK Senica, to whom they lost 5–1 on aggregate, with Shehi playing in both games. He left Bylis after their European experience, and returned to his parent club, Teuta.

Upon his return to Teuta, Shehi immediately went back into the first team and played every game in the league, helping his side finish in third place, just 3 points behind top spot. He was also part of the Albanian Cup winning team, and played in the final against KS Lushnja which Teuta won 5–4 on penalties after a goal-less draw. They qualified for the Intertoto Cup and were drawn against Icelandic side IA Akranes, to whom Shehi's side lost 6–3 on aggregate. By this point, Shehi had been handed the captaincy as he had become one of the club's most consistent performers. In the league, Teuta failed to replicate the success of the previous season, as they only managed to finish in 6th place out of 14 teams. As Teuta had won the Albanian Cup the previous season, they qualified for the 2000 Albanian Supercup which was scheduled to be played against KF Tirana, but it was delayed and eventually played on 13 January 2001. Shehi played the game but his side lost after conceding a 54th-minute goal to Indrit Fortuzi. Shehi met KF Tirana once again at the end of the season, this time in the final of the Albanian Cup, which KF Tirana also won, this time more resoundingly as they put 5 goals past Shehi to win comfortably 5–0. In the UEFA Cup, Teuta were drawn against Austrian club Rapid Vienna, as Shehi captained his side to a 6–0 aggregate loss. He helped his side finish 4th in the league as well as reach the semi-final of the Albanian Cup, losing to runners-up Dinamo Tirana. His side qualified for the Intertoto Cup, and faced Maltese side Valletta FC, whom they defeated 2–1 at home and drew to 0–0 away, and qualified for the next round after some impressive displays from Shehi. Following the arrival of Alfred Osmani ahead of the 2003–04 season, Shehi faced greater competition, and Teuta struggled somewhat and only managed a mid-table finish. This would be his final season at Teuta, as after a difficult season he would leave the club and join their Kategoria Superiore rivals Vllaznia, after 168 league appearances and nearly 200 appearances in all competitions.

Partizani
He experienced the "second spring" of his career after joining Partizani in 2005, becoming the captain in 2008.

Besa
Shehi left Partizani following a massive exodus after relegation from top flight. He then joined Besa in July 2009 by penning a one-year contract. Shehi took squad number 1, and made his debut on 23 August in the opening day against Vllaznia; Besa won 2–0. Shehi was in decent form at the start of the season, conceding only twice in the first 9 league matches, as Besa become a contender for the championship title; he went 731 minutes without conceding before being beaten by Kastrioti's Oriand Abazaj on 1 November 2009, which also ended Besa's undefeated streak. Later on 24 December, Shehi was sent-off in the 45th minute of the 1–0 controversial win versus newly promoted Gramozi for a foul inside the zone on a Gramozi player; the referee Ervis Peza did not award a penalty but instead gave a free kick which created tension and harsh protests by Gramozi's staff.

Shehi finished 2009–10 season by making 31 league appearances, being a strong instrument for Besa side which finished runner-up to Dinamo Tirana. He also made 7 cup appearances, including captaining the team in the final, which saw Besa lift the trophy after earning a 2–1 overturn win over Vllaznia at Qemal Stafa Stadium. It was Besa's second ever Albanian Cup trophy and the first in Shehi's career. Shehi also received "Fair Play" Award by association "Sporti na Bashkon".

Shehi was part of Besa squad in their UEFA Europa League campaign. Verdhezinjtë started their European campaign in the second qualifying round against Olympiacos. In the first leg on 15 July, Shehi played full-90 minutes and conceded 5 goals. Immediately after the loss, Shehi left the club to join Skënderbeu for the new season as the transfer was notified a day before.

Skënderbeu
In July 2010, Shehi completed a transfer to fellow Kategoria Superiore side Skënderbeu. He was given squad number 1, and made his club debut on 23 August against his former employer, Besa, in the opening league match.

In December 2012, Shehi was named Albanian Footballer of the Year to become the first Skënderbeu to win the award.

One of the highlights of his career was a presentation with the team in the 2013–14 UEFA Europa League play-off round, where they played against Chornomorets Odesa. After a final result of 1–1 in both legs and extra-time, they lost by penalties 6–7 when Shehi made 2 amazing penalty saves and also scored a penalty kick himself. Shehi played his 500th top flight match on 20 April 2014 in Skënderbeu's 1–0 defeat of Besa in the matchday 29. Overall he made 32 league appearances, collecting 2880 minutes as Skënderbeu clinched the title for the 4th season in a row.

On 6 December 2014, in the 3–2 league win against Teuta at home, Shehi scored his first professional goal by netting a penalty kick in the 41st minute. He was ever-present in the league during this season, appearing in all 36 matches, collecting 3168 minutes in total, helping Skënderbeu to win the league for the fifth consecutive season. At the end of the season Shehi earned "Fair Play" award for the second time in career.

On 14 June 2015, Shehi agreed to a contract extension, signing a new one-year contract. During 2015–16 season, Shehi played a major role in the team's success, contributing to 35 league matches. On 14 March 2016, in the match against title rivals Partizani, Shehi, despite making a high-profile error which resulted in a goal by Stevan Račić early in the game, saved a penalty-kick from him in the 77th minute, allowing Skënderbeu to level the score in the last moments.

In July 2016, following the retirement of long-time servant Bledi Shkëmbi, Shehi was named the new team captain. Shehi did not play any Champions League matches for the 2016–17 season as Skënderbeu was excluded from the competition by UEFA for match-fixing. He debuted in the new season on 24 August in the 2016 Albanian Supercup match against Kukësi, conceding three times in a 3–1 defeat at Selman Stërmasi Stadium.

In July 2017, Shehi expressed his intention to retire after the club's UEFA Europea League campaign, after rumours linking Enea Koliçi with a possible transfer in Korçë.

On 3 August 2017, in the returning leg of 2017–18 UEFA Europa League third qualifying round against Mladá Boleslav, Shehi made some crucial saves in the second half to help Skënderbeu win 2–1. As the first leg ended with the same result but for the opposite team, the match went to extra time and later penalty shootout. After scoring his team's first attempt, he saved Mladá's Golgol Mebrahtu attempt as Skënderbeu won 4–2 to progress to the play-off round. The club eventually achieved group stage for the second time ever after eliminating Dinamo Zagreb on play-off thanks to away goal rule (1–1 on aggregate).

Shehi was ever-presented in all Group B fixtures as Skënderbeu finished last with 5 five points. He notably kept a clean sheet in the match 3 against Partizan Belgrade. Following the end of group stage, Shehi was ranked third by the number of saves, making 26 in total. He called 2017 as the best year of his career, adding that he is likely to retire at the end of the season. On 18 March 2018, Shehi was injured during the league match versus Luftëtari and was replaced at 63rd minute; he suffered a knee ligament injury that will keep him sidelined for at least a month.

He concluded the 2017–18 season by making 28 league appearances as Skënderbeu won the championship for the 8th time in history. He played his final match on 27 May, the 2018 Albanian Cup Final versus Laçi, keeping a clean-sheet with Skënderbeu winning 1–0 and completing the domestic double for the first time in history. In June, after Court of Arbitration for Sport uphold UEFA's decision to exclude Skënderbeu from UEFA competitions for the next 10 years, Shehi announced his retirement from football.

International career

Youth
Shehi was capped for the first time in international level with the Albania national under-16 football team, making his debut in the 1994 UEFA European Under-16 Championship against Liechtenstein in a 1–0 win. He made seven appearances for the Albania national under-21 football team from 1997 to 1999 between the 1998 and 2000 UEFA European Under-21 Championship qualification.

Senior
Shehi was first approached to the senior team in September 1998 by then-coach Astrit Hafizi for the UEFA Euro 2000 qualifying fixture versus Georgia. He didn't make his debut however.

Shehi's good run with Skënderbeu in the 2010–11 season earned him a return to the national team after more than a decade, receiving a call-up by manager Josip Kuže as a replacement for the injured Arjan Beqaj for the friendly against Macedonia on 17 November 2010. He earned his first cap by appearing as a substitute in the second half as the match finished in a goalless draw.

Shehi was regular member of Albania team during the 2014 FIFA World Cup qualification campaign. He served as the third goalkeeper, sitting on bench during the whole qualifiers as Albania failed to secure a spot to the 2014 FIFA World Cup by finishing 5th in Group E.

In March 2014, he became the second choice following the departure of Samir Ujkani to represent the newly-accepted Kosovo national team. During this year, Shehi earned two other caps, making two substitute appearances in the friendlies versus Malta and San Marino.

Despite at 37 years, Shehi continued to be a back-up even in the UEFA Euro 2016 qualifying campaign. Albania eventually finished second in Group I which ment qualification in the final stage; Albania's first ever appearance at a major men's football tournament. On 21 May 2016, Shehi was named in Albania's preliminary 27-man squad for UEFA Euro 2016, and in Albania's final 23-man UEFA Euro 2016 squad on 31 May. He was an unused substitute in all Group A matches as Albania were eliminated by ranked last in the third-placed teams.

Just like in the previous campaigns, Shehi remained as a substitute, now third choice behind Alban Hoxha in Albania's 2018 FIFA World Cup qualification campaign. Albania failed to secure a spot to the World Cup by finishing third in the Group G, which was however their best-ever result.

Managerial career
On 5 July 2018, Shehi was presented as the new coach of Skënderbeu for the 2018–19 season. He made his senior managerial debut on 12 August where he oversaw Skënderbeu to a 3–2 win over Laçi in the 2018 Albanian Supercup match, thus winning his first silverware as manager. Five days later, Shehi managed his first match in the Albanian Superliga, the opening match of the 80th championship against Partizani, with Skënderbeu winning 1–0 thanks to an injury-time penalty scored by Gjergji Muzaka.

Personal life
Shehi is married to his long partner Elisabeta Shehi; the two met since the early youth years and together have two children, a boy named Aris Shehi and a girl named Serena Shehi . His favourite footballer is Juventus goalkeeper Gianluigi Buffon.

Career statistics

Club

International

Honours

Player
Teuta
 Albanian Cup: 1994–95, 1999–2000

Besa
 Albanian Cup: 2009–10

Skënderbeu
 Albanian Superliga: 2010–11, 2011–12, 2012–13, 2013–14, 2014–15, 2015–16, 2017–18
 Albanian Cup: 2017–18
 Albanian Supercup: 2013, 2014

Individual
Albanian Superliga Fair Play Award: 2009–10, 2014–15
Albanian Footballer of the Year: 2012

Manager
Skënderbeu

 Albanian Supercup: 2018

Tirana
 Albanian Superliga: 2021–22
 Albanian Supercup: 2022

References

External links

Skënderbeu Korçë official profile
Profile at Soccer Association

1977 births
Living people
Footballers from Durrës
Albanian footballers
Association football goalkeepers
Albania international footballers
UEFA Euro 2016 players
KF Teuta Durrës players
KF Bylis Ballsh players
KF Vllaznia Shkodër players
FK Partizani Tirana players
Besa Kavajë players
KF Skënderbeu Korçë players
Kategoria Superiore players
Albanian football managers
KF Skënderbeu Korçë managers
FK Kukësi managers
KF Tirana managers
Kategoria Superiore managers